Dejan Tetek (born 24 September 2002) is a footballer who plays as a midfielder for  side Reading. Born in England, he represents Serbia internationally.

Club career
Born in Oxford, Tetek made his debut for Reading on 15 September 2020 as a substitute in a 1–0 EFL Cup defeat to Luton Town. He made his league debut on 3 October 2020 as a substitute in a 1–0 victory at home to Watford.

International career
Born in England, Tetek is of Serbian descent. He was called up to the England under-18 squad in October 2019. He has made 3 appearances for England at under-18 level, scoring once. He was called up to the Serbia under-19 squad in September 2020. Tetek played for 67 minutes whilst making his debut for Serbia U19 against Romania on 10 March 2021. Tetek went on to make his Serbian U21 debut three weeks later, in a 1–0 victory over Turkey on 30 March 2021.

Career statistics

References

2002 births
Living people
Footballers from Oxford
Serbian footballers
Serbia under-21 international footballers
Serbia youth international footballers
English footballers
England youth international footballers
English people of Serbian descent
Association football midfielders
Reading F.C. players
English Football League players